Australian Field Ornithology is an online peer-reviewed ornithological journal published by BirdLife Australia.  It covers topics relating to Australasian birds, including behaviour and ecology, with an emphasis on observations and data gained in the field.

History
Originally published by the Bird Observers Club of Australia (BOCA), it was first named the Australian Bird Watcher, with the name changed in 2003. Following the merger between BOCA and Birds Australia at the beginning of 2012, it has continued to be published by the merged organisation. The founding editor-in-chief from 1959 to 1976 was Roy Percy Cooper.  the editor is James Fitzsimons. The journal moved to an online-only format in 2016.

References

External links
 

Journals and magazines relating to birding and ornithology
1959 establishments in Australia
Magazines established in 1959
Magazines published in Australia
Online magazines with defunct print editions